Most horoscopic traditions of astrology systems divide the horoscope into a number (usually twelve) of houses whose positions depend on time and location rather than on date. In Hindu astrological tradition these are known as Bhāvas. The houses of the horoscope represent different fields of experience wherein the energies of the signs and planets operate—described in terms of physical surroundings as well as personal life experiences.

Description

Every house system is  also affiliated with a zodiac sign can be dependent on the rotational movement of Earth on its axis, but there is a wide range of approaches to calculating house divisions and different opinions among astrologers over which house system is most accurate. To calculate the houses, it is necessary to know the exact time, date, and location. In natal astrology, some astrologers will use a birth time set for noon or sunrise if the actual time of birth is unknown. An accurate interpretation of such a chart, however, cannot be expected.

The houses are divisions of the ecliptic plane (a great circle containing the Sun's orbit, as seen from the earth), at the time and place of the horoscope in question. They are numbered counter-clockwise from the cusp of the first house. Commonly, houses one through six are below the horizon and houses seven through twelve are above the horizon, but some systems may not respect entirely that division (in particular when the Ascendant does not coincide with the first house's cusp).

The several methods of calculating house divisions stem from disagreement over what they mean mathematically (regarding space and time).  All house systems in Western astrology use twelve houses projected on the ecliptic. The differences arise from which fundamental plane is the object of the initial division and whether the divisions represent units of time, or degrees of distance. 

If space is the basis for house division, the chosen plane is divided into equal arcs of 30° each.  A difference will be made as to whether these divisions are made directly on the ecliptic, or on the celestial equator or some other great circle, before being projected on the ecliptic.

If time is the basis for house division, a difference must be made for whether the houses are based on invariant equal hours (each house represents 2 hours of the sun's apparent movement each day) or temporal hours (daytime and night-time divided into six equal parts, but here the temporal hours will vary according to season and latitude.)

Regardless of these different methods, all house divisions in Western astrology share certain things in common: the twelve house cusps are always projected on the ecliptic; they will all place the cusp of the first house near the eastern horizon and every house cusp is 180° of longitude apart from the sixth following house (1st opposes 7th; 2nd opposes 8th and so on).

The twelve houses

The next table represents the basic outline of the houses as they are still understood today and includes the traditional Latin names. The houses are numbered from the east downward under the horizon, each representing a specific area of life. Many modern astrologers assume that the houses relate to their corresponding signs, i.e. that the first house has a natural affinity with the first sign, Aries, and so on. Another common idea is to is to look at houses in pairs, e.g. 1-7, 2-8 and so on

House modalities and triplicities
Similarly to how signs are classified according to astrological modality (Cardinal, Fixed and Mutable), houses are classified, according to a mode of expression, as Angular, Succedent and Cadent.

Angular houses are points of initiation and represent action; they relate to cardinal signs (Aries, Cancer, Libra and Capricorn).  Succedent houses are points of purpose and represent stabilization; they relate to fixed signs (Taurus, Leo, Scorpio and Aquarius). Cadent houses are points of transition and  represent change and adaptation; they relate to mutable signs (Gemini, Virgo, Sagittarius and Pisces). 

Following the classification of signs by the four classical elements (Fire, Earth, Air and Water), houses can also be grouped together in triplicities, related to a level of experience.

In old astrological writings (e.g. William Lilly), house could also be used as a synonym for domicile or rulership, as in the sentence "The Moon has its house in Cancer" meaning that Cancer is ruled by the Moon. It may be helpful to think of a ruling planet, in this case the Moon, as the "owner of the 4th House", and the sign, e.g. Cancer, as the CEO or landlord who runs the house. In an individual horoscope, whatever planet occupies any given house can be thought of as the house's tenant. (See Rulership section below.)

The four bhavas of Hindu astrology

In Indian astrology, the twelve houses are called Bhava and their meanings are very similar to the triplicities in Western astrology. The houses are divided into four 'bhavas' which point to 'mood' or what the house stands for. These four bhavas are Dharma (duty), Artha (resources), Kama (pleasure) and Moksha (liberation). These bhavas are called 'purusharthas or 'aims in life.' The ancient mystics of India realized that the austere path of the yogi was not for everyone. They found that each human existence has four worthwhile goals in life:

 Dharma – 1st, 5th and 9th Bhavas – The need to find a path and purpose. 
 Artha – 2nd, 6th and 10th Bhavas – The need to acquire the necessary resources and abilities to provide for to fulfill a path and purpose.
 Kama – 3rd, 7th and 11th Bhavas – The need for pleasure and enjoyment.
 Moksha – 4th, 8th and 12th Bhavas – The need to find liberation and enlightenment from the world.

Theses 4 aims of life are repeated in above sequence 3 times through the 12 bhavas:
 The first round, bhavas 1 through 4, show the process within the Individual. 
 The second round, bhavas 5 through 8, show the alchemy between relating to Other people. 
 The third round, bhavas 9 through 12, show the Universalization of the self.

Houses for a nation or corporation 
In his 1920 book The Arcana: Or the Stock and Share Key, Sepharial proposed the following interpretation for houses if the chart is for a nation and a corporation:

Systems of house division

There are many systems of house division. In most, the ecliptic is divided into houses and the ascendant (eastern horizon) marks the cusp, or beginning, of the first house, and the descendant (western horizon) marks the cusp of the seventh house. Many systems, called quadrant house systems, also use the midheaven (medium coeli) as the cusp of the tenth house.

Goals for a house system include ease of computation; agreement with the "quadrant" concept (ascendant on the first house cusp and midheaven on the tenth); defined and meaningful behaviour in the polar regions; acceptable handling of heavenly bodies of high latitude (a distinct problem from high-latitude locations on the Earth's surface); and symbolic value.  It is impossible for any system to satisfy all the criteria completely, so each one represents a different compromise.  The extremely popular Placidus and Koch systems, in particular, can generate undefined results in the polar circles.  Research and debate on the merits of different house systems is ongoing.

Early forms of house division
The Babylonians may have been the first to set out the concept of house division. Specifically, they timed the birth according to three systems of time division: (a) a three-part division of the night into watches, (b) a four-part division of the nychthemeron with respect to sunrise and sunset, and (c) a twelve-part division of the day-time into hours. Babylonian astronomers studied the rising times of the signs and calculated tables of ascensions for their latitude,  but it would take better time measurements by the Egyptians and the introduction of the concept of ascendant, around the 2nd century B.C., to give astrological houses their first recognisable structure and meaning, from the perspective of Classical Western astrology.

The earliest forms of house division were those that link with, or run parallel to, the signs of the zodiac along the ecliptic.

Whole sign

In the whole sign house system, sometimes referred to as the 'Sign-House system', the houses are 30° each.  The ascendant designates the rising sign, and the first house begins at zero degrees of the zodiac sign in which the ascendant falls, regardless of how early or late in that sign the ascendant is. The next sign after the ascending sign then becomes the 2nd house, the sign after that the 3rd house, and so on. In other words, each house is wholly filled by one sign. This was the main system used in the Hellenistic tradition of astrology, and is also used in Indian astrology, as well as in some early traditions of Medieval astrology. It is thought to be the oldest system of house division.

The Whole Sign system may have been developed in the Hellenistic tradition of astrology sometime around the 1st or 2nd century BCE, and from there it may have passed to the Indian and early Medieval traditions of astrology; though the line of thought which states that it was transmitted to India from Western locales is hotly contested. At some point in the Medieval period, probably around the 10th century, whole sign houses fell into disuse in the western tradition, and by the 20th century the system was completely unknown in the western astrological community, although was continually used in India all the way into the present time. Beginning in the 1980s and 1990s the system was rediscovered and reintroduced into western astrology.
The distinction between equal houses and whole sign houses lies in the fact that in whole sign houses the cusp of the 1st house is the beginning of the sign that contains the ascendant, while in equal houses the degree of the ascendant is itself the cusp of the 1st house.

Debate surrounding whole sign houses 
There is debate surrounding the claims that the whole sign house system was the original form of house division and that it was the dominant form of house division among ancient astrologers. One argument against whole sign houses is that it is never explicitly mentioned in the text of any ancient astrologer when explaining how to divide up the houses. A counterpoint is that it is implied and it would be the only house system that makes sense in ancient charts where only an ascendant degree is presented. However, if one knows the longitude of the location of the astrologer, one would only need the ascendant degree to determine the quadrant houses. Another argument against whole sign houses is that it breaks with principles of primary motion since planets can go backwards through the houses (e.g., a planet can go from the 8th house into the 9th house given the right conditions).  Additionally, there is concern that whole sign houses demotes the value of angularity. Whole sign houses is essentially an American driven movement that is argued to have decontextualized Hellenistic astrological texts from those that preceded and proceeded them. In Europe, most astrologers previously associated with traditional astrology never really took up whole sign houses. Dr. Martin Gansten argues that in Valens, houses were often provisionally approximated by sign position alone, but calculation of places by degree was consistently upheld in principle as more accurate and useful.

Equal house
In the equal house system the ecliptic is also divided into twelve divisions of 30 degrees, although the houses are measured out in 30 degree increments starting from the degree of the ascendant. It begins with the ascendant, which acts as the 'cusp' or starting point of the 1st house, then the second house begins exactly 30 degrees later in zodiacal order, then the third house begins exactly 30 degrees later in zodiacal order from the 2nd house, and so on.   Proponents of the equal house system claim that it is more accurate and less distorting in higher latitudes (especially above 60 degrees) than the Placidean and other quadrant house systems.

Space-based house systems

In this type of system, the definition of houses involves the division of the sphere into twelve equal lunes perpendicular to a fundamental plane (the Morinus and Regiomontanus systems being two notable exceptions).

M-House (Equal Mc)
This system is constructed in a similar manner as the Equal house, but houses are measured out in 30 degree increments starting from the longitude of the midheaven, which acts as the 'cusp' or starting point of the 10th house. The ascendant does not coincide with the cusp for the 1st house.

Porphyry
Each quadrant of the ecliptic is divided into three equal parts between the four angles. This is the oldest system of quadrant style house division. Although it is attributed to Porphyry of Tyros, this system was first described by the 2nd-century astrologer Vettius Valens, in the 3rd book of his astrological compendium known as The Anthology.

Carter's Poly Equatorial
This house system was described by the English astrologer Charles E. O. Carter (1887-1968) in his Essays on the Foundations of Astrology. The house division starts at the right ascension of the ascendant and to it is added 30º of right ascension for each successive cusp. Those cusps are then restated in terms of celestial longitude by projecting them along great circles containing the North and South celestial poles. The 1st house cusp coincides with the ascendant's longitude, but the 10th house cusp is not identical with the Midheaven.

Meridian
Also known as the Axial system, or Equatorial system, it divides the celestial equator in twelve 30° sectors (starting at the local meridian) and projects them on to the ecliptic along the great circles containing the North and South celestial poles. The intersections of the ecliptic with those great circles provide the house cusps. The 10th house cusp thus equals the Midheaven, but the East Point (also known as Equatorial Ascendant) is now the first house's cusp. Each house is exactly 2 sidereal hours long. This system was proposed by the Australian astrologer David Cope in the beginning of the 20th century and has become the most popular system with the Uranian school of astrology.  The Ascendant (intersection between the ecliptic and the horizon) preserves its importance in chart interpretation through sign and aspects, but not as a house determinant, which is why this house system can be used in any latitude.

Morinus
French mathematician Jean Baptiste Morinus

Regiomontanus
The celestial equator is divided into twelve, and these divisions are projected on to the ecliptic along great circles that take in the north and south points on the horizon. Named after the German astronomer and astrologer Johann Müller of Königsberg. The Regiomontanus system was later largely replaced by the Placidus system.

Campanus
The prime vertical (the great circle taking in the zenith and east point on the horizon) is divided into twelve, and these divisions are projected on to the ecliptic along great circles that take in the north and south points on the horizon. It is attributed to Campanus of Novara but the method is known to have been used before his time.

Sinusoidal
Sinusoidal systems of house division are similar to Porphyry houses except that instead of each quadrant being divided into three equal sized houses, the middle house in each quadrant is compressed or expanded based on whether the quadrant covers less than or greater than 90 degrees. In other words, houses are smooth around the zodiac with the difference or ratio in quadrant sizes being spread in a continuous sinusoidal manner from expanded to compressed houses. Sinusoidal houses were invented and first published by Walter Pullen in his astrology program Astrolog in 1994.

Krusinski/Pisa/Goelzer

A recently published (1988) house system, discovered by Georg Goelzer, based on a great circle passing through the ascendant and zenith. This circle is divided into 12 equal parts (1st cusp is ascendant, 10th cusp is zenith), then the resulting points are projected to the ecliptic through meridian circles.

The house tables for this system were published in 1995 in Poland. This house system is also known under the name Amphora in the Czech Republic, after it was proposed there by Milan Píša after the study of Manilius's "Astronomica" under this name ("Konstelace č. 22" in: "AMPHORA - nový systém astrologických domů" (1997) and in the booklet "Amphora - algoritmy nového systému domů" (1998)).

Time-based house systems

Alchabitius
The predecessor system to the Placidus, which largely replaced the Porphyry. The difference with Placidus is that the time that it takes the ascendant to reach the meridian is divided equally into three parts. The Alchabitius house system was very popular in Europe before the introduction of the Regiomontanus system.

Placidus
This is the most commonly used house system in modern Western astrology. The paths drawn for each degree of the ecliptic to move from the Imum coeli to the horizon, and from the horizon to the midheaven, are trisected to determine the cusps of houses 2, 3, 11, and 12. The cusps of houses 8, 9, 5 and 6 are opposite these. The Placidus system is sometimes not defined beyond polar circles (latitudes greater than 66°N or 66°S), because certain degrees are circumpolar (never touch the horizon), and planets falling in them cannot be assigned to houses without extending the system. This result is a weakness of the Placidean system according to its critics, who often cite the exceptional house proportions in the higher latitudes.

Named for 17th-century astrologer Placidus de Titis, it is thought the Placidus system was first mentioned about 13th century in Arab literature, but the first confirmed publication was in 1602 by Giovanni Antonio Magini (1555–1617) in his book "Tabulae Primi Mobilis, quas Directionem Vulgo Dicunt". The first documented usage is from Czech, 1627. Later it was popularized by the Catholic Church as an argument for Ptolemy's geocentric theory of the Solar System, in the campaign against the heliocentric theory.  Placidus, a professor of mathematics, was named as its author to give it credibility to his contemporaries. Placidus remains the most popular system among English-speaking astrologers.

Koch
A rather more complicated version of the Placidus system, built on equal increments of Right Ascension for each quadrant. The Koch system was developed by the German astrologer Walter Koch (1895–1970) and is defined only for latitudes between 66°N and 66°S.  This system is popular among research astrologers in the U.S. and among German speakers, but in Central Europe lost some popularity to the Krusiński house system.

Topocentric
This is a recent system, invented in Argentina, that its creators claim has been determined empirically, i.e. by observing events in people's lives and assessing the geometry of a house system that would fit. The house cusps are always within a degree of those given in the Placidus system. The topocentric system can also be described as an approximation algorithm for the Placidus system. 

Topocentric houses are also called Polich-Page, after the names of the house system creators, Wendel Polich and A. Page Nelson.

Chart gallery
The following charts display different house systems for the same time and location. To better compare systems subject to distortion, a high latitude city was chosen (Stockholm, Sweden) and the time corresponds to a long ascension sign (Cancer). For clarity purposes, all the usual aspect lines, degrees and glyphs were removed.

The MC in non-quadrant house systems
In the whole sign and equal house systems the Medium Coeli (Midheaven), the highest point in the chart, does not act as the cusp or starting point of the 10th house. Instead the MC moves around the top half of the chart, and can land anywhere in the 7th, 8th, 9th, 10th, 11th, 12th, depending on the latitude.  The MC retains its commonly agreed significations, but it doesn't act as the starting point of the 10th house, whereas the Equal house system adds extra definition and meaning to the MC including any cusps involved, any interpretations applied to the MC itself concur with other house systems.

This is also the more common criticism of the whole sign and equal house method as it concerns the location of the Medium Coeli (Midheaven), the highest point in the chart. In the equal house system, the ascendant/descendant and midheaven/IC axes can vary from being perpendicular to each other (from approx. +-5 deg at most at equator to approx. +-15 degrees at Alexandria to +-90 degrees at polar circle). As a result, equal houses counted from the ascendant cannot in general place the midheaven on the tenth house cusp, where many feel it would be symbolically desirable. Since this point is associated with ambition, career, and public image, the argument is that the Midheaven, therefore, must be the cusp of the similar tenth house. It has also been linked by extension with Capricorn (the tenth sign of the zodiac). The equal house system always takes the MC to be first and foremost THE most important indicator of career; whereas the 10th house cusp, while taken into account, is interpreted simply as a weaker 2nd MC cusp. The Midheaven is not associated with house locations defined by the Whole Sign and Equal House system, rather, the Midheaven placement relies on the specific location of the Ascendant, so the Midheaven can be found anywhere between the 8th and 11th houses.

Rulership 

In Hellenistic, Vedic, Medieval and Renaissance astrology each house is ruled by the planet that rules the sign on its cusp. For example, if a person has the sign Aries on the cusp of their 7th house, the planet Mars is said to "rule" the 7th house. This means that when a planet is allotted a house, the planet's attributes will have some bearing on the topics related to that house within the life of the individual whose chart is being analyzed. This planet is considered very important for events specifically pertaining to that house's topics; in fact, its placement in the chart will have at least as much influence on the chart as the planets placed within the house. In traditional Western and Hindu astrology, each sign is ruled by one of the 7 visible planets (note that in astrology, the Sun and Moon are considered planets, which literally means wanderers, i.e. wandering stars, as opposed to the fixed stars of the constellations). 

In addition, some modern astrologers who follow the X=Y=Z or Planet=Sign=House doctrine, which was first taught by Alan Leo in the early part of the 20th century, believe that certain houses are also ruled by—or have an affinity with—the planet which rules the corresponding zodiacal sign. For instance, Mars is ruler of the 1st house because it rules Aries, the first sign; Mercury rules (or has an affinity with) the 3rd house because it rules Gemini, the 3rd sign; etc.

This concept is sometimes referred to as "natural rulership," as opposed to the former which is known as "accidental rulership."

Notes

References 
Arroyo, Stephen (1989). Chart Interpretation Handbook. California: CCRS Publications. 
Carter, Charles (1947; 2nd ed. 1978). Essays on the Foundations of Astrology - Chapter 8 "Problems of the Houses". London: Theosophical Publishing House. 
Collins, Gene. F. (2009). "Cosmopsychology - The psychology of humans as spiritual beings". Xlibris Corporation. 
DeVore, Nicholas (1948). Encyclopedia of Astrology. Philosophical Library, sub. tit. "Houses"
Dobyns, Zipporah P. (1973). Finding the person in the horoscope. Third Edition. California: T.I.A. Publications (CCRS Publications)
Foreman, Patricia (1992). "Computers and astrology: a universal user's guide and reference". Virginia: Good Earth Publications. 
Hand, Rob (2000). Whole Sign Houses: The Oldest House System. ARHAT Publications.
Holden, James (1982). Ancient House Division, Journal of Research of the American Federation of Astrologers 1.
Hone, Margaret (1978). The Modern Text-Book of Astrology. Revised edition (1995). England: L. N. Fowler & Co. Ltd. 
Houlding, Deborah (1996; Reprinted 2006). The Houses: Temples of the sky. Bournemouth: The Wessex Astrologer, Ltd. 
Kenton, Warren (1974). Astrology. The Celestial Mirror. Reprinted (1994). London: Thames and Hudson. 
Mayo, Jeff (1979). Teach Yourself Astrology. London: Hodder and Stoughton.
North, John D. (1986). Horoscopes and History. London: The Warburg Institute, University of London. 
Parker, Derek and Julia (1990). The New Complete Astrologer. New York: Crescent Books.
Rochberg, Francesca (1998). Babylonian Horoscopes. Transactions of the American Philosophical Society. 
Tester, Jim (1987). "A History of Western Astrology". Reprinted (1990). Suffolk: St Edmundsbury Press. 

+
Astrology
Technical factors of Hindu astrology
Technical factors of Western astrology